Irene May Leigh CBE FRSE FMedSci is a British dermatologist. A former professor of Barts and The London School of Medicine and Dentistry, she is now a professor emeritus at the University of Dundee School of Medicine. Her research has focused on keratinocytes, non-melanoma skin cancers and genetic skin diseases. She was elected to the Academy of Medical Sciences in 1999 and appointed CBE in 2012.

Biography
Born in Liverpool, Leigh completed her medical studies at the London Hospital Medical College. After qualifying, she specialised in dermatology. During her specialist training, she lectured in medicine at the University of Dar es Salaam in Tanzania for two years. She returned to London afterwards to complete her registrar training, and was appointed a consultant dermatologist to the Royal London Hospital in 1983. The same year, she set up a research laboratory at the hospital; she was also a research fellow at the Cancer Research UK London Research Institute, and was awarded an MD degree. Her research laboratory, the Centre for Cutaneous Research, became a national leader in skin biology research, and in 1992 Leigh was appointed professor of dermatology at Barts and The London School of Medicine and Dentistry. She received a DSc degree and was elected to the Academy of Medical Sciences in 1999. She was made professor of cell and molecular medicine at Barts and The London in 1999 and held the positions of research dean (1997–2002) and research director (2002–2005).

In 2006, Leigh moved to the University of Dundee School of Medicine, where she was the head of the College of Medicine, Dentistry and Nursing, a vice-principal of research, and chair of cellular and molecular medicine. She was appointed OBE in 2006 and CBE in 2012. She was also awarded the Archibald Gray Medal, the highest honour of the British Association of Dermatologists, in 2012.

Research
Leigh's research focus has been keratinocytes, a type of skin cell. She has studied the role of keratin in non-melanoma skin cancers and hereditary skin diseases, and discovered that numerous genetic diseases of the skin are caused by mutations in keratin, plectin, desmosomal proteins and connexins. Her research group also showed that human papillomavirus plays an oncogenic role in non-melanoma skin cancers. In her early career, she helped to identify the cause of recessive dystrophic epidermolysis bullosa and develop a monoclonal antibody for diagnosis of the condition.

References

Living people
English dermatologists
English medical researchers
Commanders of the Order of the British Empire
Officers of the Order of the British Empire
Alumni of the London Hospital Medical College
Academics of Barts and The London School of Medicine and Dentistry
Fellows of the Academy of Medical Sciences (United Kingdom)
Academics of the University of Dundee
Medical doctors from Liverpool
Year of birth missing (living people)